Radohova is a settlement in the Kotor Varoš Municipality, Republika Srpska entity, Bosnia and Herzegovina. The settlement includes the hamlets of Ulice, Letići, Lapići, Traljići, Kerkezi, Gigovići, Demići, and Dunići, located on the slopes of Zastijenje, and extend from the Ulički stream to the source of Demićka (left tributary of the Vrbanja river) and the Djevojačka Ravan ("Girls' plain"). Its length is ca. 6 km.

Geography

Radohova includes a number of hamlets on the Zastijenje slopes at altitudes of 640–850 m and belt about 10 km long. Local roads, all villages have access to regional road R-440: Šiprage – Kotor Varoš – Čelinac – Banja Luka.

History
Above Dunići remains of stećci (tombstones) have been discovered.

During World War II, the Yugoslav Partisans were active in Radohova. A Partisan divisional hospital was located below Dunići rocks and Demići, in the gorge of Demićka river. It was repeatedly bombed during the Sixth Enemy Offensive.

During the Bosnian War (1992–95), Army of Republika Srpska (VRS), police and paramilitary forces demolished the surrounding Bosniak villages, especially those upstream along the Vrbanja to Kruševo Brdo, as well as all Bosniak villages downstream to Banja Luka.

Population

References

External links
 Official site of Kotor Varoš Municipality

Villages in Bosnia and Herzegovina
Populated places in Kotor Varoš